is a Japanese voice actress who is affiliated with Across Entertainment. Her birthname was originally given in Katakana language (森田 チアキ). She has done voice roles for anime and video games. She also did some foreign voice-dubbing as well. She has also worked as a Teacher in Certified elementary and kindergarten schools.

Filmography
Major roles are in: Bold.

Anime
Bad Boys – Tsukasa
Bakusou Kyoudai Lets & Go Max – Sabouraud
Beyblade G-Revolution – Tala Valkov, Child Acrobat (ep 27), Reporter A (ep 32), Yuri
Beyblade – Carlos/Hiruta, Tala Valkov, Yuri
Brave Exkaiser – Takumi
Doraemon – Ken, Tooru
Flint The Time Detective – Tokio
Golden Brave Goldran – Kazu Tokimura
Nakoruru – Hokute
Saint Tail – Ninomiya Tatsuo
Trigun – Tonis
Wrestler Gundan Seisenshi Robin Jr. – Momosaki Wakakouji
Samurai Shodown (OVA) - Hokute

Video games
Bravesage 2 - Kazuki
Robot Senki: Brave Saga New Generation - Kazuki
Snowboard Kids - Slash Kamei
Snowboard Kids Plus - Slash Kamei
Snowboard Kids 2 - Slash Kamei, Damien
Suikoden V - Cathari, Maroon, Nikea, Sorensen

External links
Official agency profile 

1968 births
Living people
Voice actresses from Hokkaido
Japanese video game actresses
Japanese voice actresses
Across Entertainment voice actors